Ryan Donald Burton (born 31 January 1997) is a professional Australian rules footballer playing for the Port Adelaide Football Club in the Australian Football League (AFL).

Early life 
Ryan Burton was raised in Adelaide, and attended Sacred Heart. He participated in the Auskick program at his primary school. He later played his junior football at PHOS Camden and Sacred Heart.  In 2014, he played four games for North Adelaide in the SANFL, all at the age of 17. He was still young enough to play in the 2014 NAB AFL Under-18 Championships. He kicked five goals in a game for South Australia against Western Australia.

Late 2014 Burton broke his leg while playing football in an interschool match. He required surgery for the injury, resulting in orthopedic surgeon Matthew Liptak, a former Adelaide Crows player, inserting a metal plate and 10 screws into his leg. Burton spent 2015 in rehabilitation. Before he broke his leg, Burton was the state's hottest 2015 draft prospect.

AFL career

Hawthorn
He was drafted by the Hawthorn Football Club with their first selection and nineteenth overall in the 2015 national draft.

He played two games early for Box Hill before having an operation to remove the screws and plate in his leg.

He made his debut in round 21, 2016. He kicked a goal with his very first kick.
Burton played four games in a row but he suffered a calf injury during the 2016 Qualifying Final versus the Geelong Cats, and his season ended there.

Entering into his second season, Burton changed from number 35 to the number 5 guernsey following Sam Mitchell’s move to West Coast at the end of the 2016 season.

He earned a Rising Star nomination in round 2, 2017, in a 24 point loss to Adelaide at the MCG, with 26 possessions, nine marks and four tackles.

On 17 July 2017 it was announced that Burton had signed a three-year contract extension to stay at Hawthorn until the end of 2020.

Port Adelaide
Burton, who was overseas on holiday at the time, was reportedly unhappy with how Hawthorn was treating the trade with him and especially the circumstances with him being a contracted player. Nonetheless, Burton saw the opportunity to return home to South Australia and play for this boyhood club. Burton was officially traded to the Port Adelaide on 17 October.

Family 

Burton is the son of dual North Adelaide premiership player Craig Burton. This enabled him to transfer from Glenelg to North Adelaide under the SANFL father son rule.

Statistics
Updated to the end of 2022.

|-
| 2016 ||  || 35
| 4 || 1 || 2 || 30 || 11 || 41 || 15 || 7 || 0.3 || 0.5 || 7.5 || 2.8 || 10.3 || 3.8 || 1.8 || 0
|-
| 2017 ||  || 5
| 20 || 4 || 1 || 268 || 158 || 426 || 114 || 58 || 0.2 || 0.1 || 13.4 || 7.9 || 21.3 || 5.7 || 2.9 || 2
|-
| 2018 ||  || 5
| 23 || 0 || 5 || 245 || 144 || 389 || 100 || 39 || 0.0 || 0.2 || 10.7 || 6.3 || 16.9 || 4.3 || 1.7 || 0
|-
| 2019 ||  || 3
| 16 || 4 || 4 || 220 || 95 || 315 || 61 || 33 || 0.3 || 0.3 || 13.8 || 5.9 || 19.7 || 3.8 || 2.1 || 0
|-
| 2020 ||  || 3
| 8 || 0 || 1 || 74 || 27 || 101 || 30 || 8 || 0.0 || 0.1 || 9.3 || 3.4 || 12.6 || 3.8 || 1.0 || 0
|-
| 2021 ||  || 3
| 24 || 0 || 1 || 320 || 113 || 433 || 133 || 61 || 0.0 || 0.0 || 13.3 || 4.7 || 18.0 || 5.5 || 2.5 || 0
|-
| 2022 ||  || 3
| 22 || 4 || 4 || 348 || 99 || 447 || 115 || 43 || 0.2 || 0.2 || 15.8 || 4.5 || 20.3 || 5.2 || 2.0 || 0
|- class="sortbottom"
! colspan=3| Career
! 117 !! 13 !! 18 !! 1505 !! 647 !! 2152 !! 568 !! 249 !! 0.1 !! 0.2 !! 12.9 !! 5.5 !! 18.4 !! 4.9 !! 2.1 !! 2
|}

Notes

Honours and achievements
Team
 Minor premiership: 2020

Individual
 22 Under 22 team: 2017
 AFL Rising Star nominee: 2017
  most promising player: 2017

See also
 List of first kick/first goal kickers in the Australian Football League

References

External links

1997 births
Living people
Hawthorn Football Club players
North Adelaide Football Club players
Box Hill Football Club players
Australian rules footballers from South Australia
Port Adelaide Football Club players
People educated at Sacred Heart College, Adelaide